Walston may refer to:

Walston, South Lanarkshire, a hamlet in Scotland
Walston, Pennsylvania, a community in the United States